Novonikolsk is large village in the Ussuriysky Urban Okrug of Primorsky Krai of Russia. Novonikolsk is the center of a rural area which includes the villages of Elitnoe and Stepnoe.

Founded in 1866, but the official founding date of 1910 is considered.

References 

Rural localities in Primorsky Krai